The Ruta Panorámica (Scenic Route), officially the Ruta Panorámica Luis Muñoz Marín (Luis Muñoz Marín Scenic Route), is a  network of some 40 secondary roads which traverse the island of Puerto Rico from west to east along its Cordillera Central (Central Mountain Range).  Most of the route consists of three roads, PR-105, PR-143, and PR-182. The route starts in Mayagüez and ends in Maunabo. The first major segment of the route runs from Mayagüez to Maricao as Route 105, then from Adjuntas to Aibonito as Route 143, and then follows Route 182 toward Maunabo.

Route description

As the Route is a two-way road, it can be traveled starting at either its western or its eastern termini.  To travel the Route in a westerly direction (i.e., from Maunabo to Mayagüez), the course of the road is reversed from what is given here.  Starting from Mayagüez and ending in Maunabo, as of August 2010, the course of the Route is as follows:

PR-105 Municipality of Mayagüez (Eastbound)
PR-339 Municipality of Mayagüez (Eastbound)
PR-119 Municipality of Mayagüez (Northbound)
PR-106 Municipality of Mayagüez (Eastbound)
PR-106 Municipality of Las Marias (Eastbound)
PR-120 Municipality of Las Marias (Southbound)
PR-120 Municipality of Maricao (Southbound)
PR-120 Municipalities of Maricao and San Germán (Eastbound)
PR-120 Municipalities of Maricao and Sabana Grande (Eastbound)
Landmark: Maricao State Forest, site of Monte del Estado
PR-366 Municipalities of Maricao and Sabana Grande (Eastbound)
PR-365 Municipalities of Maricao and Yauco (Eastbound)
PR-105 Municipalities of Maricao and Yauco (Eastbound)
PR-128 Municipality of Maricao (Northbound)
PR-128 Municipality of Lares (Northbound)
PR-135 Municipality of Lares (Eastbound)
PR-135 Municipality of Adjuntas (Eastbound)
Landmark: Lago Guayo
PR-525 Municipality of Adjuntas (Eastbound)
PR-518 Municipality of Adjuntas (Eastbound)
Landmark: Lago Garzas
PR-123 Municipality of Adjuntas (Southbound)
PR-143 Municipality of Adjuntas (Eastbound)
PR-143 Municipality of Ponce (Eastbound)
Landmark: Toro Negro State Forest
PR-143 Municipality of Jayuya (Eastbound)
PR-143 Municipality of Ponce (Eastbound)
PR-143 Municipality of Villalba (Eastbound)
Landmark: Salto de Doña Juana Waterfall (2 miles)
Landmark: Villalba Overlook
PR-143 Municipality of Orocovis (Eastbound)
PR-143 Municipality of Coamo (Eastbound)
PR-143 Municipality of Barranquitas (Eastbound)
PR-723 Municipality of Barranquitas (Southbound)
PR-7718 Municipality of Aibonito (Eastbound)
Landmark: Piedra Degetau Overlook
PR-7722 Municipality of Cayey (Eastbound)
PR-1 Municipality of Cayey (Eastbound)
PR-715 Municipality of Cayey (Southbound)
PR-7737 Municipality of Cayey (Eastbound)
PR-741 Municipality of Cayey (Eastbound)
PR-7741 Municipality of Cayey (Eastbound)
PR-742 Municipality of Cayey (Eastbound)
PR-179 Municipality of Cayey (Northbound)
PR-184 Municipality of Cayey (Southbound)
Landmark: Carite State Forest, Guavate
PR-7740 Municipalities of San Lorenzo and Patillas (Eastbound)
PR-181 Municipality of San Lorenzo (Southbound)
PR-182 Municipality of Yabucoa (Eastbound)
PR-901 Municipality of Yabucoa (Eastbound)
PR-3 Municipality of Yabucoa (Southbound)
PR-3 Municipality of Maunabo (Southbound)

History
Early in the 1970s, the Autoridad de Carreteras de Puerto Rico (Puerto Rico Roads Authority) developed a  route along the Cordillera Central. The route was finished in 1974. According to the original plans, the route started at Cerro Las Mesas in Mayagüez, ran along the full length of the central mountains, including along parts of the length of the Sierra de Cayey to end at Cuchilla de Pandura, in Yabucoa. The development of the route included the building of overlooks, rest areas, and recreational facilities at a cost of $4 million. In 1975, it was estimated that the cost of the necessary facilities to complete the Route - but excluding roads already built - amounted to $20 million. National Geographic has called the route "an assemblage of 40-plus roads that cuts through the island's lush Cordillera Central."

Major intersections
Note: kilometer markers represent the distance along the numbered highways rather than the Ruta Panorámica.

See also

 List of highways in Ponce, Puerto Rico
 Carretera Central (Puerto Rico)

References

External links
 

Highways in Puerto Rico